The 2010–11 Northern Football League season was the 113th in the history of Northern Football League, a football competition in England.

Division One

Division One featured 19 clubs which competed in the division last season, along with three new clubs, promoted from Division Two:
 Jarrow Roofing
 Stokesley
 Sunderland RCA

League table

Results

Division Two

Division Two featured 17 clubs which competed in the division last season, along with three new clubs, relegated from Division One:
Chester-Le-Street Town
Horden Colliery Welfare
Morpeth Town

League table

Results

References

External links
 Northern Football League official site

Northern Football League seasons
9